William Rush (born 6 July 1994) is a British actor, best known for his role in the BBC One school-based drama series Waterloo Road as Josh Stevenson.

Early life
Rush attended Bamford Academy and trained at Manchester School of Acting.

Career
Rush started his career in Channel 4's Shameless, as a lad at an ice cream van, before being given a small part in BBC's Grange Hill, playing the role of Ali Duncan. He also appeared in The Street and Drop Dead Gorgeous. From 2009 to 2012, he played Josh Stevenson in Waterloo Road and made a guest appearance the following year.

In 2016, Rush auditioned for series 13 of The X Factor and made it through to the six-chair challenge, the third of four elimination stages.

Personal life
Rush is the son of Coronation Street actress Debbie Rush and has an older sister, actress Poppy Rush, and a brother, Tom.

Filmography

References

External links

1994 births
Living people
English male film actors
English male television actors
People from Bury, Greater Manchester
Male actors from Greater Manchester
21st-century English male actors